Gamston may refer to:

Places
Gamston, Bassetlaw, near Retford, in the north of Nottinghamshire, England
Gamston, Rushcliffe, near West Bridgford, in the south of Nottinghamshire, England

Other uses
 Retford Gamston Airport, between Retford and Gamston in Nottinghamshire, England
 HMS Gamston, a British Royal Navy ship name
 , a Royal Navy Cold War minesweeper

See also

 
 Gams (disambiguation)
 Gam (disambiguation)